Polis is a village and a former municipality in the Elbasan County, eastern Albania. At the 2015 local government reform it became a subdivision of the municipality Librazhd. It has an area of approximately 100 km^2. The population at the 2011 census was 3,385.

References

Former municipalities in Elbasan County
Administrative units of Librazhd
Villages in Elbasan County